Hubert Pagden (7 December 1897 – 15 February 1981) was a South African cricketer. He played in sixteen first-class matches for Eastern Province between 1924/25 and 1930/31.

See also
 List of Eastern Province representative cricketers

References

External links
 

1897 births
1981 deaths
South African cricketers
Eastern Province cricketers
Cricketers from Port Elizabeth